Chinese Uruguayans are Uruguayan citizens of Chinese ancestry or are Chinese people residing in Uruguay.

Overview
The first flow of immigration arrived in 1949, coming from mainland China and Taiwan. Nowadays there are some 400 Chinese immigrants in Uruguay, mostly living in Montevideo. Their activities include gastronomy, fishing, groceries.

The 2011 Uruguayan census revealed 226 people who declared China as their country of birth. As of 2013, there are 44 Chinese citizens registered in the Uruguayan social security.
Compared to neighboring Argentina and Brazil, with both nations containing a large population, Chinese immigration is significantly smaller in Uruguay.

There are a Chinese Uruguayan Association and a Uruguay-China Chamber of Commerce in Montevideo.

Some Chinese immigrants teach their language to Uruguayans.

Notable people
 Cheung-Koon Yim (Beijing, 11 December 1936), architect and university professor who fled from the Chinese Civil War.
 Adi Yacong Wu, a professor of the Mandarin Chinese language.

See also
 China–Uruguay relations
 Chinese Argentines

References

Asian Uruguayan
Ethnic groups in Uruguay
Uruguay
Chinese diaspora in South America
China–Uruguay relations
Chinese Latin American
Immigration to Uruguay